The Capture of Valkenburg of 1574, took place in early February 1574, at Valkenburg, South Holland (present-day the Netherlands), during the Eighty Years' War and the Anglo-Spanish War (1585–1604), in the context of the siege of Leiden. The fortress of Valkenburg (northwest of Leiden), garrisoned by five English companies commanded by Colonel Edward Chester, was of strategic importance to facilitate (or complicate) the Spanish efforts at Leiden. In early February, when the Spanish troops (sent by Maestre de Campo Don Francisco de Valdés) advanced over Valkenburg Castle, the English troops surrendered the fortress to the Spaniards and fled towards Leiden. Then, the Spanish forces entered and took possession of the fortress (Spanish: tomando la fortaleza a placer). For the cowardice demonstrated at Valkenburg, the English troops were rejected by the Dutch rebel army at Leiden, and finally Chester's troops surrendered to the Spanish army.

Soon after, the English forces at Alphen (now called Alphen aan den Rijn, southwest Leiden), were defeated as well, and at Gouda, another English force was surprised and defeated by a contingent of Spanish troops, with the loss of 300 men and three colours for the English.

In April 1574, Francisco de Valdés halted the siege of Leiden, to face the invading rebel army led by Louis of Nassau and Henry of Nassau-Dillenburg (brothers of Prince William of Orange), but the Spanish forces commanded by General Don Sancho d'Avila reached them first, leading to the Battle of Mookerheyde.  The Dutch suffered a disastrous defeat, losing at least 3,000 men, with both Louis and Henry killed. Finally, the rebel army dispersed due to lack of pay.

See also

 Siege of Leiden 
 Battle of Reimerswaal
 Battle of Mookerheyde
 States-General of the Netherlands
 List of Governors of the Spanish Netherlands

Notes

References
 Mark Charles Fissel. English Warfare, 1511-1642. First published 2001. London, Great Britain. 
 Oscar Gelderblom. The Political Economy of the Dutch Republic. Published by Ashgate Publishing Limited. England 2009. 
 Tracy, James. The Founding of the Dutch Republic: War, Finance, and Politics in Holland 1572–1588. Oxford University Press. First published 2008.
 A.N. Wilson. The Elizabethans. Published by Arrow Books 2012. Great Britain. 
 Radhey Shyam Chaurasia. History of Europe. Atlantic Publishers and Distributors 2002. New Delhi. 
 Motley, John Lothrop. The History of The Netherlands (Complete). Published by the Library of Alexandria. 
 Jeremy Black. War in the World: A Comparative History, 1450-1600. First published 2011 by Palgrave MacMillan.

External links
 James Tracy. The Founding of the Dutch Republic: War, Finance, and Politics in Holland 1572–1588.

Sieges of the Eighty Years' War
Sieges involving Spain
Sieges involving England
Sieges involving the Dutch Republic
1574 in Europe
Conflicts in 1574